Sounds of the Season: The Julianne Hough Holiday Collection is a Christmas themed EP released by country music artist Julianne Hough. Released on October 12, 2008, the EP was available for purchase only at the American discount department store chain Target. The album contains two original tracks, "Sounds of Christmas" and "Christmas Memories".

In early 2009, the album peaked at #2 on the Hot Country Albums chart.

The EP was released on iTunes under the name The Julianne Hough Holiday Collection on March 9, 2016.

Track listing
"Sounds of Christmas" – 1:08
instrumental track 
"Jingle Bell Rock" – 2:23
"Feliz Navidad" – 3:29
Medley: "It Wasn't His Child" / "Mary, Did You Know?" – 4:17
featuring Phil Vassar
"Santa Baby" - 2:55
"Rockin' Around the Christmas Tree" – 1:56
"Christmas Memories" – 0:58
"Have Yourself a Merry Little Christmas" – 3:53

Charts

Weekly charts

Year-end charts

References

Julianne Hough albums
2008 Christmas albums
2008 debut EPs
Albums produced by David Malloy
Christmas albums by American artists
Country Christmas albums
Mercury Records EPs
Christmas EPs